Pakaraka is a settlement in Northland, New Zealand, at the junction of State Highway 1 and 10, in the district the Ngāpuhi tribe called Tai-a-mai.

Demographics

Pakaraka had a population of 666 at the 2018 New Zealand census, an increase of 111 people (20.0%) since the 2013 census, and an increase of 159 people (31.4%) since the 2006 census. There were 222 households, comprising 333 males and 333 females, giving a sex ratio of 1.0 males per female. The median age was 40.7 years (compared with 37.4 years nationally), with 147 people (22.1%) aged under 15 years, 96 (14.4%) aged 15 to 29, 333 (50.0%) aged 30 to 64, and 93 (14.0%) aged 65 or older.

Ethnicities were 80.2% European/Pākehā, 34.2% Māori, 0.9% Pacific peoples, and 1.4% other ethnicities. People may identify with more than one ethnicity.

The percentage of people born overseas was 14.0, compared with 27.1% nationally.

Although some people chose not to answer the census's question about religious affiliation, 55.4% had no religion, 32.0% were Christian, 1.4% had Māori religious beliefs,  and 0.9% had other religions.

Of those at least 15 years old, 96 (18.5%) people had a bachelor's or higher degree, and 90 (17.3%) people had no formal qualifications. The median income was $29,400, compared with $31,800 nationally. 78 people (15.0%) earned over $70,000 compared to 17.2% nationally. The employment status of those at least 15 was that 264 (50.9%) people were employed full-time, 84 (16.2%) were part-time, and 24 (4.6%) were unemployed.

History and culture

Pre-European history

The pā was studied during a major archeological project in the 1980s.

Parts of the Flagstaff War were fought around Pakaraka in 1845. After the Battle of Ohaeawai on 23 June 1845 the British troops destroyed Te Haratua's pā at Pakaraka on 16 July 1845.

Modern history

Mount Pouerua is registered with the Heritage New Zealand as a traditional site. Holy Trinity Church. The Retreat and the Store are also registered with the trust.

Marae

The local Kahukura Ariki Marae and Kahukura Ariki meeting house are affiliated with the Ngāti Kahu ki Whangaroa hapū of Hāhi Katorika, and the Ngāpuhi / Ngāti Kahu ki Whaingaroa hapū of Ngāti Kohu.

Education

Pakaraka School is a coeducational full primary (years 1–8) school with a roll of  students as of  In 2018, all but one of the students was Māori. The school opened in 1911.

Notable people
Hone Heke, a Ngāpuhi chief, was born at Pakaraka in about 1807 or 1808. He was buried here in secret in August 1850. In 2011 his remains were removed due to possible development of the land around the burial site.
The missionary Henry Williams retired to Pakaraka and built a church in 1850–51. The church that now stands on the site was opened on 27 November 1873, the church was constructed by Williams' wife and family as a memorial to his life. The church is named Holy Trinity Church as Trinity Sunday was the day on which Henry was ordained by the Bishop of London, and Trinity Sunday was also the last day that Henry and Marianne Williams spent at Paihia before moving to Pakaraka. They lived by the church in a house known as The Retreat, that still stands.
The first and third sons of the missionary Henry Williams, Edward & Henry farmed here.

Gallery

Notes

External links
 Pakaraka School website

Far North District
Populated places in the Northland Region
Flagstaff War